Tarom Sara (also Romanized as Ţārom Sarā; also known as Ţārom Sarā-ye Pā’īn) is a village in Gil Dulab Rural District, in the Central District of Rezvanshahr County, Gilan Province, Iran. At the 2006 census, its population was 404, in 106 families.

References 

Populated places in Rezvanshahr County